The 2015 Karjala Tournament was played between 5–8 November 2015. The Czech Republic, Finland, Sweden and Russia played a round-robin for a total of three games per team and six games in total. Five of the matches were played in the Hartwall Areena in Helsinki, Finland, and one match in the Fjällräven Center in Örnsköldsvik, Sweden. The tournament was won by Sweden. The tournament is part of 2015–16 Euro Hockey Tour.

Standings

Games
All times are local.
Helsinki – (Eastern European Time – UTC+2) Örnsköldsvik – (Central European Time – UTC+1)

Scoring leaders
GP = Games played; G = Goals; A = Assists; Pts = Points; +/− = Plus/minus; PIM = Penalties in minutes; POS = Position
Source: Swehockey

Goaltending leaders
TOI = Time On Ice (minutes:seconds); SA = Shots against; GA = Goals against; GAA = Goals against average; Sv% = Save percentage; SO = Shutouts
Source: Swehockey

References

2015–16 Euro Hockey Tour
Karjala
Karjala
Karjala Tournament
November 2015 sports events in Europe
2010s in Helsinki
Sports competitions in Örnsköldsvik